The Thai Institute of Chemical Engineering and Applied Chemistry (TIChE) is a professional organization for chemical engineers. TIChE was established in 1996 to distinguish chemical engineers as a profession independent of chemists and mechanical engineers.

History

TIChE was established to force the chemical engineering professional certificate isolated from the industrial engineering. The conference in 1990 was the first effort to establish the organization by the cooperation of Department of Chemical Engineering and Department of Chemical Technology, Chulalongkorn University, and Department of Chemical Engineering, King Mongkut's University of Technology Thonburi. In the 4th conference at Khon Kaen University, 1994, TIChE was formally established and permitted by law on November 15, 1996. Now, TIChE composes 18 university members.

The Objectives of TIChE

 To promote and support the chemical engineering and chemical technology profession.
 To promote and support the educational standard of chemical engineering and chemical technology.
 To encourage cooperation and industrial development including research and knowledge.
 To disseminate knowledge and consulting in chemical engineering and chemical technology.
 To be an agent of chemical engineering and chemical technology profession to cooperate with other organizations.

University Members
(sorted alphabetically)

 Burapha University
 Department of Chemical Engineering
 Chiang Mai University
 Department of Industrial Chemistry
 Chulalongkorn University
 Department of Chemical Engineering
 Department of Chemical Technology
 The Petroleum and Petrochemical College
 Kasetsart University
 Department of Chemical Engineering
 Khon Kaen University
 Department of Chemical Engineering
 King Mongkut's Institute of Technology Ladkrabang
 Department of Chemical Engineering
 King Mongkut's University of Technology North Bangkok
 Department of Chemical Engineering
 Department of Industrial Chemistry
 King Mongkut's University of Technology Thonburi
 Department of Chemical Engineering
 Mahanakorn University of Technology
 Department of Chemical Engineering
 Mahidol University
 Department of Chemical Engineering
 Prince of Songkla University
 Department of Chemical Engineering
 Rajamangala University of Technology Thanyaburi (Klong 6)
 Department of Chemical Engineering
 Rangsit University
 Department of Chemical and Material Engineering
 Silpakorn University
 Department of Chemical Engineering
 Srinakharinwirot University
 Department of Chemical Engineering
 Suranaree University of Technology
 School of Chemical Engineering
 Thammasat University
 Department of Chemical Engineering
 Ubon Ratchathani University
 Department of Chemical Engineering

List of Conference Meetings 
  7th International Thai Institute of Chemical Engineering and Applied Chemistry Conference (ITIChE 2017) and The 27th National Thai Institute of Chemical Engineering and Applied Chemistry Conference (TIChE 2017)
 18–20 October 2017 Shangri-La Hotel, Bangkok
 The 18th Thailand Chemical Engineering and Applied Chemistry Conference.
 20–21 October 2008 at Jomtien Palm Beach Resort, Cholburi.
 Host: Department of Chemical Engineering, Mahidol University, Nakhon Pathom.
 The 17th Thailand Chemical Engineering and Applied Chemistry Conference.
 29–30 October 2007 at The Empress Hotel, Chiang Mai.
 Host: Department of Industrial Chemistry, Chiang Mai University, Chiang Mai.
 The 16th Thailand Chemical Engineering and Applied Chemistry Conference.
 26–27 October 2006 at Rama Garden Hotel, Bangkok.
 Host: Department of Chemical Engineering, Kasetsart University, Bangkok.
 The 15th Thailand Chemical Engineering and Applied Chemistry Conference.
 27–28 October 2005 at Jomtien Palm Beach Resort, Cholburi.
 Host: Department of Chemical Engineering, Burapha University, Cholburi.
 The 14th Thailand Chemical Engineering and Applied Chemistry Conference.
 Host: Department of Chemical Engineering, King Mongkut's Institute of Technology North Bangkok, Bangkok.
 The 13th Thailand Chemical Engineering and Applied Chemistry Conference.
 30–31 October 2003 at Royal Hill Resort and Golf Course, Nakhon Nayok.
 Host: Department of Chemical Engineering, Srinakharinwirot University, Nakhon Nayok.

Website

References

Chemical engineering organizations
Professional associations based in Thailand
Thai Institute of Chemical Engineering
Research institutes established in 1994
Scientific organizations established in 1994
1994 establishments in Thailand